Denière et Matelin were prominent French bronziers,  producers of ornamental patinated and gilt-bronze objects and mounts working in Paris during the Directoire and First French Empire periods.

Named for Jean-François Denière (1774–1866) and François Thomas Matelin (1759–1815), the firm is known for the production of ormolu furniture mounts, candelabra, torchères, and ornamental mantel clocks. Suppliers to the French court before the revolution, the company, after the revolution, and before the establishment of the First Empire under First-Consul Napoleon Bonaparte, primarily exported to European courts and nobility and the emerging United States. Under the Empire government the firm regained favor in France, producing furniture mounts, candelabra, and clock cases for the homes of the regime.

See also 
 French Empire mantel clock

References
 Costaz, L. Rapport du Jury Central sur les Produits de l'Exposition Française. Paris, 1819.
 C***, Mr. le Comte de. Quelques réflexions sur l’industries en général à l’occasion de l’exposition des produits de l’industrie française en 1819. Paris, 1819.
 Héricart de Thury, L. Rapport du jury d’admission des produits de l’industrie du dépertement de la Seine, à l’exposition du Louvre. Paris, 1819.
 Monkman, Betty C. The White House: The Historic Furnishing & First Families. Abbeville Press: 2000. .
 The White House: An Historic Guide. White House Historical Association and the National Geographic Society: 2001. .

Furniture designers from Paris
French decorative artists
Furniture companies of France
French goldsmiths